Then Came You is a studio album by the American singer Dionne Warwick. Sharing its title with the number one hit song Warwick performed a year before with The Spinners, the album was released by Warner Bros. Records in 1975 in the United States. The album peaked at number 167 on the US Billboard 200.

Critical reception

AllMusic editor Jason Elias found that Then Came You "is mostly an innovative effort of New York R&B/pop that should make anyone's short list of albums that truly capture the style [...] Here [Warwick] wasn't so much an interpreter of 'great material,' her voice and charm were the primary draw."

Track listing

Personnel and credits 
Credits adapted from the liner notes of Then Came You.

Musicians

Bob Babbitt (as Robert Babbit Kreinar) – bass
Thom Bell – arrangement and conducting (on "Then Came You")
George Devens – vibraphone
Jerry Friedman – guitar
Arthur Jenkins – congas
Jack Jennings – vibraphone
Ray Lucas – drums
Jeff Mironov – guitar
Leon Pendarvis – piano
Andrew Smith – drums
The Spinners – vocals (on "Then Came You")
Jerry Ragovoy – arrangements
John Tropea – guitar
Larry Wilcox – string and horn arrangements
Dionne Warwick – vocals

Technical

Bruce Tergesen, Harry Maslin, Jim McCurdy – engineer
Albert Watson – photography

Charts

References

Dionne Warwick albums
1975 albums
albums produced by Jerry Ragovoy
albums produced by Thom Bell